The Tobin Center for the Performing Arts is San Antonio's performing arts center. Located next to the San Antonio Riverwalk, it is named for Robert L. B. Tobin, one of the city's most prominent residents.

History
The 1738-seat venue was first built in 1926 as the San Antonio Municipal Auditorium by Atlee Ayres.  In 2014, it was renovated and expanded by the Seattle-based LMN Architects and the local firm Marmon Mok Architecture.

During the 2008 presidential election campaign, Barack Obama gave a speech in front of the building to his supporters.

On October 2, 2014, Sir Paul McCartney performed a special benefit concert for the Tobin Center.

Performance and other venues

H-E-B Performance Hall
This 1738-seat theater at the core of the center was designed to accommodate both acoustic and amplified performances with the specific intent of being the home to the San Antonio Symphony, Opera San Antonio, and Ballet San Antonio. Seating is on four levels — orchestra, grand tier boxes, mezzanine, and balcony.

Carlos Alvarez Studio Theater
Built as a "black box theater," the hexagon shaped space is a unique venue that offers a blank canvas customizable for any event.

References

External links

Official website

Theatres in San Antonio
Cinemas and movie theaters in Texas
Theatres completed in 2014
2014 establishments in Texas